Þórdís or Thordis is an Icelandic name. Notable people with the name include:

Þórdís Árnadóttir (1933–2013), Icelandic swimmer
Thordis Brandt (born 1940), German-American actress
Thordis Elva, Icelandic author
Þórdís Gísladóttir (born 1965), Icelandic author
Þórdís Hrönn Sigfúsdóttir (born 1993), Icelandic footballer
Þórdís Kolbrún R. Gylfadóttir (born 1987), Icelandic politician
Þórdís Kristmundsdóttir (born 1948), Icelandic professor
Thordis Loa Thorhallsdottir (born 1965), Icelandic politician